The 2010 Morocco Tennis Tour – Marrakech was a professional tennis tournament. Part of the 2010 ATP Challenger Tour, it took place on outdoor red clay courts in Marrakech, Morocco between 15 and 21 March 2010.

ATP entrants

Seeds

Rankings are as of March 8, 2010.

Other entrants
The following players received wildcards into the singles main draw:
  Rabie Chaki
  Reda El Amrani
  Malek Jaziri
  Mehdi Ziadi

The following players received entry from the qualifying draw:
  Andrea Arnaboldi
  David Goffin
  Denis Gremelmayr
  Sergio Gutiérrez Ferrol

The following player received special exempt into the main draw:
  Bastian Knittel

Champions

Singles

 Jarkko Nieminen def.  Oleksandr Dolgopolov Jr., 6–3, 6–2

Doubles

 Ilija Bozoljac /  Horia Tecău def.  James Cerretani /  Adil Shamasdin, 6–1, 6–1

External links
Morocco Tennis Tour official website

Morocco Tennis Tour - Marrakech
Marrakech
Morocco Tennis Tour – Marrakech
Morocco Tennis Tour – Marrakech